Agapanthia subchalybaea is a species of beetle in the family Cerambycidae. It was described by Reitter in 1898.

References

subchalybaea
Beetles described in 1898